Niknam Deh may refer to:
 Niknam Deh, Mazandaran
 Niknam Deh, Tehran